Brian Dearg Ó Dubhda (1221?–1242) was the King of Ui Fiachrach Muaidhe.

External links
 http://www.ucc.ie/celt/published/T100005A/

References

 The History of Mayo, Hubert T. Knox, p. 379, 1908.
 Genealach Ua fFiachrach Muaidhe, 263.8 (pp. 596–97), 264.5 (pp. 598–99); Araile do fhlathaibh Ua nDubhda/Some of the princes of Ui Dhubhda, pp. 676–681; Leabhar na nGenealach:The Great Book of Irish Genealogies, Dubhaltach Mac Fhirbhisigh (died 1671), eag. Nollaig Ó Muraíle, 2004–05, De Burca, Dublin.

People from County Sligo
Monarchs from County Mayo
13th-century Irish monarchs
1242 deaths
Year of birth unknown